Pitcairnia sanguinea is a species of plant in the family Bromeliaceae. It was previously classified as Pepinia sanguinea before it was moved to the genus Pitcairnia.

References
Pap. Bot. 4: 208 (1999).

sanguinea